Whipple was a proposed space observatory in the NASA Discovery Program. The observatory would try to search for objects in the Kuiper belt and the theorized Oort cloud by conducting blind occultation observations. Although the Oort cloud was hypothesized in the 1950s, it has not yet been directly observed. The mission would attempt to detect Oort cloud objects by scanning for brief moments where the objects would block the light of background stars.

In 2011, three finalists were selected for the 2016 Discovery Program, and Whipple was not among them, but it was awarded funding to continue its technological development efforts.

Description
Whipple would orbit in a halo orbit around the Earth–Sun  and have a photometer that would try to detect Oort cloud and Kuiper belt objects (KBOs) by recording their transits of distant stars. Some of the mission goals included directly detecting the Oort cloud for the first time and determining the outer limit of the Kuiper belt. Its telescope would need a relatively wide field of view and fast recording cadence to capture transits that may last only seconds.

In 2011, Whipple was one of three proposals to win a technology development award in a Discovery Program selection. The design proposed was a catadioptric Cassegrain telescope with a 77-centimeter aperture (30.3 inches). It would have a wide field of view with a fast read-out CMOS detector to achieve the desired time and photometric sensitivity.

The smallest KBO yet detected was discovered in 2009 by poring over data from the Hubble Space Telescope's fine guidance sensors. It has been suggested that the Kepler observatory may be able to detect objects in the Oort cloud by their occultation of background stars.

See also
Fred Lawrence Whipple Observatory 
List of proposed space observatories
List of Solar System objects most distant from the Sun
List of space observatories
Near-Earth Object Camera, a proposed space telescope
New Horizons, Pluto and KBO flyby probe
Whipple shield, a type of spacecraft shielding

References

External links
Whipple: Exploring the Solar System Beyond Neptune Using a Survey for Occultations of Bright Stars

Discovery program proposals
Oort cloud
Cancelled spacecraft
Space telescopes
Stellar occultation